Microprocessor Report is a newsletter covering the microprocessor industry. The publication is accessible only to paying subscribers. To avoid bias, it does not take advertisements.

The publication provides extensive analysis of new high-performance microprocessor chips. It also covers microprocessor design issues, microprocessor-based systems, memory and system logic chips, embedded processors, GPUs, DSPs, and intellectual property (IP) cores.

History and profile
Microprocessor Report was first published in 1987 by Michael Slater. Original board members included Bruce Koball, George Morrow, and J H Wharton all of whom served for many years. Originally published monthly in print, since 2000 it has been published weekly online and monthly in print. Slater left MicroDesign Resources (MDR), at the end of 1999.

Typical articles describe the internal design and feature set of microprocessors from vendors such as Intel, Broadcom, and Qualcomm. The articles usually compare the leading products and discuss their strengths and weaknesses. The annual "year in review" articles provide a broader look at the processor landscape. The publication gives annual awards to the best microprocessor products. Free summaries of these articles are available online.

Slater's company MDR, based in Sebastopol, California, originally published Microprocessor Report. MDR also hosted an annual conference, the Microprocessor Forum, and related events. In 1992, MDR was acquired by Ziff Davis. During the 1990s, Microprocessor Report was recognized four times as Best Newsletter by the Computer Press Association, which noted its "comprehensive and in-depth coverage."

In 1999, MDR was sold to Cahners Business Information (later Reed Business Information), where it became part of the analyst group In-Stat. During the 2000s, the staff of the newsletter declined. On 6 May 2010, Microprocessor Report was acquired by The Linley Group.

In addition to Slater, regular contributors have included Linley Gwennap, Keith Diefendorff, Steven Leibson, Markus Levy, Peter Glaskowsky, Kevin Krewell, Tom Halfhill, Jim McGregor, and Max Baron. The current staff is led by editor-in-chief Gwennap with Bob Wheeler, Mike Demler, and Aakash Jani. Tom Halfhill retired in June 2020.

Slater wrote an account of the early years for the newsletter's tenth anniversary. Slater also recounted his career in an oral history at the Computer History Museum.

References

1987 establishments in California
Computer magazines published in the United States
Monthly magazines published in the United States
Online magazines published in the United States
Science and technology magazines published in the United States
Engineering magazines
Magazines established in 1987
Magazines published in California
Professional and trade magazines
Newsletters